Skibet er ladet med is a 1960 Danish comedy film directed by Peer Guldbrandsen and starring Kjeld Petersen.

Cast

 Kjeld Petersen - Reklamechef Kurt Svendsen
 Jørgen Reenberg - Musikforlægger Peter Bangel
 Frits Helmuth - Max Ibsen
 Louis Miehe-Renard - Radiomekaniker Ib Blomquist
 Mimi Heinrich - Viola
 Dirch Passer - Guvernør Alfond d. 1 / Alfond d. 2
 Preben Lerdorff Rye - Skipper på Jupiter
 Jon Branner - Kalle Karlson
 Marianne Wesén - Britta
 Gerda Madsen - Gudrun
 Sven Buemann - Skattesekretær Sørensen
 Christian Hartkopp - Skattesekretær
 Mogens Brandt - Programchef i Støjhuset
 Aage Winther-Jørgensen - Støjhus direktør
 Else Jarlbak - Støjhus direktørfrue
 Elith Foss - Krigsminister
 Svend Bille - Generalen
 Knud Rex - Flådechef
 Povl Wøldike
 Bjørn Puggaard-Müller - Søofficer
 Jørgen Buckhøj - Mariner
 Preben Kaas - Betjent Mortensen
 Gunnar Strømvad - Grænsevagt i Piratia
 Bent Bentzen
 Kitty Beneke
 Jørgen Krogh - Matros
 Flemming Dyjak - Matros
 Bjørn Spiro - Grænsevagt i Piratia

External links

1960 films
1960s Danish-language films
1960 comedy films
Danish black-and-white films
Films directed by Peer Guldbrandsen
Danish comedy films